The 2008 Bank of America 500 was a NASCAR Sprint Cup Series stock car race held on October 11, 2008 at Lowe's Motor Speedway in Concord, North Carolina. The race was the thirty-first race of the 2008 NASCAR Sprint Cup season and fifth of the Chase for the Sprint Cup, serving as the only Saturday night race in the Chase as of 2008. The 334-lap,  race was televised on ABC. The race's television broadcast began at 7 pm ET, and the Performance Racing Network along with Sirius Satellite Radio had radio coverage starting at the same time.

Jeff Burton earned his 21st and final Cup Series victory with this race.

Pre-race news
 Patrick Carpentier was released from driving the  10 Gillett Evernham Motorsports Dodge after an argument with his team manager about his performance during time trials the week before at Talladega. Carpentier missed the race, despite being quicker  than his teammates during practice.  Mike Wallace was Carpentier's replacement for the race.

Entry list

Qualifying
Because of rain, qualifying was canceled for the eighth time this season, and so the cars lined up by rulebook.

Starting lineup 

Failed to qualify: Brad Keselowski (No. 25), Scott Speed (No. 82), Bryan Clauson (No. 40), Derrike Cope (No. 75).

Race recap

Race results

References

Bank of America 500
Bank of America 500
NASCAR races at Charlotte Motor Speedway
October 2008 sports events in the United States